Yaza Dewi was a principal queen consort of King Binnya Ran II of Hanthawaddy. She was the fourth of the four senior queens who partook in Ran's coronation ceremony in April 1495.

References

Bibliography
 

Queens consort of Hanthawaddy